The 1750s (pronounced "seventeen-fifties") was a decade of the Gregorian calendar that began on January 1, 1750, and ended on December 31, 1759. The 1750s was a pioneering decade. Waves of settlers flooded the New World (specifically the Americas) in hopes of re-establishing life away from European control, and electricity was a field of novelty that had yet to be merged with the studies of chemistry and engineering. Numerous discoveries of the 1750s forged the basis for contemporary scientific consensus. The decade saw the end of the Baroque period.

Significant people

References